Bergama Museum is a museum in Bergama district of İzmir Province, Turkey.

Location
The museum is in Bergama city .

History
Bergama (ancient Pergamon) is a historically important city. Although the most important ancient monument of Bergama, namely the Pergamon Altar had been transported to Pergamon Museum in Berlin, Germany in 1870, there are still enough items to be displayed in Bergama. The museum was established upon the suggestion of Marshal Fevzi Çakmak in 1932. It was opened on 30 October 1936.

Displays
Both the archaeological and ethnographical items are exhibited. The archaeological items are from the excavations around Bergama. Most notable among these are sculptures of Pergamon school, items from Pitane and Gryneion  and terra-cotta from Myrina. These ancient greek settlements are between Bergama and İzmir. In the ethnographical section the most important items are carpets and rugs from Bergama, Yuntdağ, Yağcıbekir etc.

References

Buildings and structures in İzmir Province
Bergama
Archaeological museums in Turkey
1936 establishments in Turkey
Museums established in 1936